The 1877 Tufts Jumbos football team represented Tufts College—now known as Tufts University in the 1877 college football season. The team compiled a record of 0–3.

Schedule

References

Tufts
Tufts Jumbos football seasons
College football winless seasons
Tufts Jumbos football